Just Testing is the tenth studio album by the British rock band Wishbone Ash, released on 18 January 1980 by MCA Records. Recorded primarily at Surrey Sound Studios in England, it was the last to feature the original lead vocalist and bass guitarist Martin Turner until the release of Nouveau Calls (1987). The track "Helpless" is only the second cover version released by the band on a studio album, the previous one being "Vas Dis" on Pilgrimage.

The album reached number 43 in the UK Albums Chart.

Track listing

Personnel

Wishbone Ash
Andy Powell – electric and acoustic guitars, back vocals
Laurie Wisefield – electric and acoustic guitars, back vocals
Martin Turner – lead vocals, bass guitar, acoustic guitar, back vocals; co-producer
Steve Upton – drums and percussion

Additional musicians
Claire Hamill – vocals (on "Living Proof", "Pay the Price" and "Master of Disguise")
Ian Kew – organ (on "Master of Disguise")

Technical personnel
John Sherry – co-producer
Martin Moss – engineer
Bob Broglia – engineer
Colin Elgie – sleeve design
Hipgnosis – photography and art direction

Charts

References

External links
The Official Wishbone Ash Website
Classic Wishbone Ash History

Wishbone Ash albums
Albums with cover art by Hipgnosis
1980 albums
MCA Records albums